The 1972 Texas Longhorns football team represented the University of Texas at Austin in the 1972 NCAA University Division football season.  The Longhorns finished the regular season with a 9–1 record and defeated Alabama in the Cotton Bowl Classic.

Schedule

Personnel

Rankings

References

Texas
Texas Longhorns football seasons
Southwest Conference football champion seasons
Cotton Bowl Classic champion seasons
Texas Longhorns football